USS Proteus has been the name of several ships in the United States Navy.

, an American Civil War steamer that was purchased in 1864
, the lead ship of the Proteus-class colliers
, a Fulton-class submarine tender

United States Navy ship names